Gopalrao Patil is an Indian politician and pediatrician. He belongs to the Bharatiya Janata Party and is a former member of the Rajya Sabha (Upper House of the Parliament of India). He is the president of Shivchhatrapati Shikshan Sanstha, which runs the Rajarshi Shahu College, Latur, Maharashtra.

Patil stood as the BJP candidate for the Latur Lok Sabha seat in the 1998 Indian general election. He again contested the Latur seat in the 1999 Indian general election.

References

People from Latur
Living people
Marathi politicians
Bharatiya Janata Party politicians from Maharashtra
Rajya Sabha members from Maharashtra
Indian paediatricians
1931 births
People from Marathwada
Medical doctors from Maharashtra